$2 primarily refers to banknotes, bills or coins, including:

Currency 

 Australian two dollar coin, which replaced
 Australian 2 dollar note
 Toonie, the Canadian two-dollar coin, which replaced 
 Canadian two-dollar bill
 United States two-dollar bill, a current denomination of U.S. currency (although not often used)
 Hong Kong two-dollar coin, the third-highest denomination coin of the Hong Kong dollar
 New Zealand two-dollar coin, which replaced the two-dollar banknote

Other currencies with $2 banknotes, bills or coins are:

Bahamian dollar
Barbadian dollar
Belize dollar
Bermudian dollar

Cook Islands dollar

Fijian dollar

Samoan tālā
Singapore dollar
Solomon Islands dollar

Tuvaluan dollar

Tongan paanga
Argentine peso

Mexican peso
Uruguayan peso
Brazilian real

Other uses 
$2, a formal parameter in some programming languages